Stubhaug is a surname. Notable people with the surname include:

Arild Stubhaug (born 1948), Norwegian mathematician, poet and writer
Lars Stubhaug (born 1990), Norwegian footballer

Norwegian-language surnames